Waverly is a city in and the county seat of Humphreys County, Tennessee, United States. The population was 4,297 at the 2020 census.

History
Waverly was established by Steven Pavatt as a stop along the stagecoach road between Nashville and Memphis in the early 19th century. Pavatt was a fan of the author Sir Walter Scott, and named the community after Scott's Waverley Novels. When Humphreys County was created in 1803, Reynoldsburg, located northwest of Waverly along the Tennessee River, was chosen as the county seat. However, when county lands on the west bank of the Tennessee split off to become part of the newly created Benton County in 1835, the Humphreys County seat was moved to Waverly, which had become the more central location in the county. A courthouse was built in 1836, and the town was officially incorporated in 1838.

Like most of Middle and West Tennessee, Waverly was staunchly pro-Confederacy during the American Civil War. Humphreys County voted unanimously in favor of secession in 1861. Union troops occupied the town in 1863 to guard the railroad between White Bluff and Johnsonville (now Old Johnsonville), the latter being a Federal supply depot and transfer station. The Union troops managed to build a fort at the courthouse square, although they were constantly harassed by Confederate guerillas. On November 4, 1864, Confederate troops under Nathan Bedford Forrest attacked and destroyed the Federal depot in what became known as the Battle of Johnsonville.

Hurricane Mills, located a few miles south of Waverly along TN-13, was the site of a substantial mill and carding factory in the late 19th and early 20th centuries. A Mississippian-era prehistoric village (known as the Duck River Temple Mounds or Link Farm Site) and a farm owned by Jesse James were both located near the Link farm site in the vicinity of Hurricane Mills.

On February 24, 1978, a propane tank car explosion occurred in downtown Waverly after an L&N train derailed. The explosion, which killed 16 people, led to an overhaul of the methods used by the Tennessee Emergency Management Agency when responding to hazardous material spills. It also led to various strengthened standards and regulations (e.g., for design and construction of rail cars) by the National Transportation Safety Board.

During the morning of August 21, 2021, very heavy rainfall and totals of over  caused Trace Creek to overflow in the middle of town, leading to catastrophic flooding in Waverly. Floodwaters impacted many homes and businesses, electric, telephone, and water services, churches, and Waverly Elementary School. All roads in and out of town were made impassable, and 20 people were killed in Humphreys County.

Geography
Waverly is located at  (36.085847, −87.786917). The low ridges that "wall in" Waverly to the north and south represent the fringe of the western section of the Highland Rim.

Waverly is centered on the junction of U.S. Route 70, which connects the city to Nashville to the east and Memphis to the west, and State Route 13, which connects the city to Hurricane Mills and Interstate 40 to the south and the rural areas around Erin to the north.

Demographics

2020 census

As of the 2020 United States census, there were 4,297 people, 1,730 households, and 939 families residing in the city.

2010 census

2000 census
As of the 2000 census, the racial makeup of the city was 88.75% White, 9.51% African American, 0.15% Native American, 0.22% Asian, 0.37% from other races, and 0.99% from two or more races. 1.17% of the population is Hispanic or Latino of any race.

There were 1,716 households, out of which 27.6% had children under the age of 18 living with them, 47.7% were married couples living together, 14.6% had a female householder with no husband present, and 34.8% were non-families. 31.4% of all households were made up of individuals, and 15.0% had someone living alone who was 65 years of age or older. The average household size was 2.27 and the average family size was 2.81.

In the city the population was spread out, with 22.2% under the age of 18, 7.5% from 18 to 24, 26.7% from 25 to 44, 24.4% from 45 to 64, and 19.2% who were 65 years of age or older. The median age was 40 years. For every 100 females, there were 89.7 males. For every 100 females age 18 and over, there were 84.5 males.

The median income for a household in the city was $32,614, and the median income for a family was $44,375. Males had a median income of $30,610 versus $19,297 for females. The per capita income for the city was $18,139. About 10.9% of families and 15.7% of the population were below the poverty line, including 21.0% of those under age 18 and 15.1% of those age 65 or over.

Notable residents
 Deborah Adams, author
 Murray Bowen, psychiatrist and professor
 Susan Goodman, 1983 Mrs. America
 George Morgan, country music singer
 Daryl Mosley, singer, musician, and songwriter.

References

Further reading

External links
 City of Waverly official website
 Humphreys County Chamber of Commerce

Cities in Humphreys County, Tennessee
County seats in Tennessee
Cities in Tennessee